Pe (majuscule: Պ; minuscule: պ; Armenian: պե) is the twenty-sixth letter of the Armenian alphabet. It has a numerical value of 800. It is created by Mesrop Mashtots in the 5th century. In Eastern Armenian, it represents the voiceless bilabial stop (/p/) while in Western Armenian, it represents the voiced bilabial stop (/b/).

Its minuscule form is similar in shape to the voiced velar approximant (ɰ) and the Cyrillic letter Cche (Ꚇ ꚇ).

Computing codes

Gallery

See also
 Armenian alphabet
 Mesrop Mashtots
 Voiced velar approximant
 P

References

External links
 Պ on Wiktionary
 պ on Wiktionary

Armenian letters